Warings Corner is a community in Prince Edward County, Ontario. It is situated at the intersection of Loyalist Parkway and Prince Edward County road 1.

Communities in Prince Edward County, Ontario